The Maruyama River is a river in Hyōgo Prefecture, Japan.

References

Rivers of Hyōgo Prefecture
Rivers of Japan